The 14th Army was an army level command of the German Army in World War I formed in September 1917 in Krainburg for use against Italy.  Its headquarters was located at Vittorio Veneto from 10 November 1917 until the army was disbanded on 22 January 1918.  The 14th Army served on the Italian Front throughout its existence.

History 

After the Eleventh Battle of the Isonzo, the Austro-Hungarians were exhausted and could not have withstood another attack. They appealed to the Germans for help and the Germans, fearing a collapse on the Italian Front, sent 7 divisions, 540 guns, 216 mortars and about 100 aircraft from the Western and Eastern Fronts.  To control these troops, a new 14th Army under General der Infanterie Otto von Below was concentrated between Tolmin and Bovec. For the Battle of Caporetto a number of Austro-Hungarian divisions were added.

Following the successful offensive, the front soon froze again in trench warfare. The German High Command decided to withdraw its forces again to use on other fronts.  On 23 January 1918 the Army Command was recalled (to form a new 17th Army on the Western Front). The German troops remaining on the Italian front came under the command of 51st Corps until it was withdrawn in February 1918.

Outline Order of Battle, Battle of Caporetto 
Units are German unless designated as Austria-Hungary.

Commanders 
The 14th Army was commanded throughout its existence by General der Infanterie Otto von Below, former commander of 6th Army.  On dissolution of 14th Army, von Below was transferred to command of the newly raised 17th Army on the Western Front.

See also 

14th Army (Wehrmacht) for the equivalent formation in World War II

References

Bibliography 
 
 

14
Military units and formations established in 1917
Military units and formations disestablished in 1918